"Girlfriend" is the second single by American boy band B2K from their second studio album, Pandemonium! (2002). It was written and produced by R. Kelly. The song was included on the special edition of the album, which was released in March 2003. The single peaked at number 30 on the US Billboard Hot 100 and number 19 on the Hot R&B/Hip-Hop Songs. It's also B2K's final top-40 hit.

Music video
In the music video, the boys walk out of a mall and Omarion meets a girl (Jennifer Freeman). He gets her phone number and then the girl's father, Mr. Biggs (Ronald Isley), comes along and tells him to stay away from his daughter, which is also repeated by his bodyguard (Big Boy). The girl in the car tells Omarion to give her a call and then the car drives away. Then the guys start to dance once the music begins and they are all dressed in white. The video then goes to a scene where Omarion and the girl are planning a date over the phone. However, both of them are unaware that Mr. Biggs is listening to the conversation on another line and he orders his security guards to kidnap Omarion. J-Boog, Raz-B and Lil' Fizz call up a woman (Vivica A. Fox) and tell her what happened. A man (Flex Alexander) pulls up in a parking lot where the guys are waiting and takes them to see the Godfather (Will Smith), who orders them to save Omarion. The guys break into Mr. Biggs' house, fight the guards and rescue Omarion. Mr. Biggs walks in to see that Omarion is gone and his guards have been beaten. Then the Godfather calls him and asks him to "let it go" and Mr. Biggs accepts and lets Omarion date his daughter. The video ends with Omarion asking the girl to be his girlfriend and she accepts.

Track listings

US CD single
 "Girlfriend" (main version) – 3:26
 "Girlfriend" (Ron G remix main version) – 3:18

US 12-inch single
A1. "Girlfriend" (main version) – 3:26
B1. "Girlfriend" (instrumental) – 3:24
B2. "Girlfriend" (a cappella) – 3:26

US 12-inch remix single
 "Girlfriend" (Ron G remix main version) – 3:18
 "Girlfriend" (Ron G remix instrumental) – 3:18
 "Girlfriend" (Ron G remix a cappella) – 3:18

Australian CD single
 "Girlfriend" (main version) – 3:27
 "Girlfriend" (Ron G remix) – 3:18
 "Girlfriend" (Pied Piper remix featuring R. Kelly) – 2:58
 "Bump, Bump, Bump" (remix radio edit featuring P. Diddy and Nazkar) – 3:54

UK CD1
 "Girlfriend" (Ron G remix) – 3:27
 "Girlfriend" (Pied Piper remix featuring R. Kelly) – 2:56
 "Girlfriend" (main version) – 3:26
 "Girlfriend" (Pied Piper remix instrumental) – 2:54
 "Girlfriend" (video)

UK CD2
 "Girlfriend" (Ron G remix) – 3:27
 "Bump, Bump, Bump" (remix main version featuring P. Diddy and Nazkar) – 4:54
 "Bump That" (main version) – 3:16

UK cassette single
 "Girlfriend" (Ron G remix) – 3:27
 "Girlfriend" (Pied Piper remix featuring R. Kelly) – 2:56

European CD single
 "Girlfriend" (main version) – 3:26
 "Girlfriend" (Pied Piper remix featuring R. Kelly) – 2:56

Charts

Weekly charts

Year-end charts

Release history

References

2002 songs
2003 singles
B2K songs
Epic Records singles
Song recordings produced by R. Kelly
Songs written by R. Kelly